The Mirror is a 1913 short silent film directed by Anthony O'Sullivan.

Cast
 Henry B. Walthall – The Station Agent
 Claire McDowell – Daisy
 Lionel Barrymore – Daisy's Father
 Harry Carey – First Tramp
 Charles West – Second Tramp
 John T. Dillon – Third Tramp

See also
 Harry Carey filmography
 Lionel Barrymore Filmography

External links

1913 films
American silent short films
American black-and-white films
Films directed by Anthony O'Sullivan
Films with screenplays by Frank E. Woods
1910s American films